PMLA may refer to:

 Prevention of Money Laundering Act, 2002, an Act of the Parliament of India
 Prime Minister's Literary Awards, Australia
 Publications of the Modern Language Association of America, a journal